The Neighbourhood Action Movement (MAV) is a national localist political party in Argentina based in Córdoba Province. It was founded in 1999 by Kasem Dandach, an immigrant from Lebanon who served as a provincial lawmaker. It has run its own candidates in presidential elections in 2015 and 2019, both times it has failed to secure enough votes to cross the threshold mandated by the Mandatory, Open and Simultaneous Primaries (PASO) to participate in the general election.

According to Raúl Albarracín, the party's leader in Córdoba Province and twice presidential candidate, the Neighbourhood Action Movement stands for a free market economy, supporting regional economies in Argentina's provinces and introducing a reform of the judiciary.

Electoral performance

President

References

Political parties established in 1999
1999 establishments in Argentina
Centrist parties in South America